Boiling Springs or Boiling Spring is the name of several places in the United States:

Boiling Springs, North Carolina
Boiling Springs, Pennsylvania
Boiling Springs, South Carolina
Boiling Spring, Alleghany County, Virginia
Boiling Springs State Park, a park in Woodward County, Oklahoma